Real Sranang (English: Royal Suriname) is a Dutch amateur  football (soccer) club from Amsterdam, founded on 1 June 1960, that plays its home games at the Sportpark Middenmeer.

History
Founded on 1 June 1960, by Surinamese immigrants in the Dutch Capital Amsterdam, Sranang means Suriname in the Sranan Tongo language, and the club is known to be mostly composed of players from the Surinamese community of Amsterdam. The club started the 2013–14 season fielding a Saturday team in the Derde Klasse, and a Sunday team playing in the Vijfde Klasse of the KNVB district West-I. The Sunday first team withdrew from the competition after only seven matches played.

References

External links 
 Real Sranang Official website

Football clubs in the Netherlands
Association football clubs established in 1960
Football clubs in Amsterdam
1960 establishments in the Netherlands
Diaspora sports clubs
Surinamese diaspora